Badal Jamadar is an Indian teacher and politician. He was elected as MLA of Bhangar Vidhan Sabha Constituency in West Bengal Legislative Assembly in 1991, 1996, 2001 and 2011.

References

Living people
Communist Party of India (Marxist) politicians from West Bengal
West Bengal MLAs 1991–1996
West Bengal MLAs 1996–2001
West Bengal MLAs 2001–2006
West Bengal MLAs 2011–2016
Indian schoolteachers
1940 births